Sid Jensen (born 11 August 1947) is a Canadian gymnast. He competed in eight events at the 1968 Summer Olympics.

References

External links
 

1947 births
Living people
Canadian male artistic gymnasts
Olympic gymnasts of Canada
Gymnasts at the 1968 Summer Olympics
Sportspeople from Halifax, Nova Scotia
Gymnasts at the 1971 Pan American Games
Pan American Games bronze medalists for Canada
Pan American Games medalists in gymnastics
Medalists at the 1971 Pan American Games
20th-century Canadian people
21st-century Canadian people